Spanish nobles are persons who possess the legal status of hereditary nobility according to the laws and traditions of the Spanish monarchy and historically also those who held personal nobility as bestowed by one of the three highest orders of knighthood of the Kingdom, namely the Order of the Golden Fleece, the Order of Charles III and the Order of Isabella the Catholic. A system of titles and honours of Spain and of the former kingdoms that constitute it make up the Spanish nobility. Some nobles possess various titles that may be inherited, but the creation and recognition of titles is legally a prerogative of the King of Spain.

Many noble titles and families still exist which have transmitted that status since time immemorial. Some aristocratic families use the nobiliary particle de before their family name, although this was more prominent before the 20th century. During the rule of Generalísimo Francisco Franco, some new hereditary titles were conferred on individuals, and the titles granted by the Carlist pretenders were officially recognised.

Despite the accession to the throne of Spain by Juan Carlos I in 1975, the royal court of nobles holding positions and offices attached to the Royal Household was not restored. Noble titleholders are subjected to taxation, whereas under Spain's Ancien Régime (until 1923) they were exempt. King Juan Carlos resumed conferral of titles to recognize those whose public service, artistic endeavour, personal achievement, philanthropy, etc. is deemed to have benefitted the Spanish nation.

Spanish nobility today

As of 2023, there are approximately 2,237 nobles in Spain, and there are 418 Grandes de España, with 2,825 total titles of Spanish nobility. Some nobles may carry more than one title of nobility. Many are active in the worlds of business, finance, and technology, with some taking on leadership roles in major IBEX 35 companies, some of Spain's largest companies. Examples include the president of FCC, Esther Alcocer Koplowitz, 9th Marchioness of Casa Peñalver, or Alfonso Martínez de Irujo Fitz-James Stuart, Duke of Híjar, president of IE Law School in Madrid.

Legal situation
In Spain today, the possession of a title of nobility does not imply any legal or fiscal privilege; On the contrary, the possession of titles of nobility is subject to the payment of a normal level of taxation. It is a distinction of merely honorary and symbolic character, accompanied by the treatment of the most excellent lord for those titles that possess the dignity of grandees of Spain and of illustrious lords for others. The last privilege, suppressed in 1984, was the right to a diplomatic passport by the Grandees of Spain (Grandes de España). This privilege disappeared by Royal Decree 1023/1984. The titles without the rank of grandee of Spain never enjoyed this privilege.

With the establishment of the Second Spanish Republic in 1931, the use of noble titles was abolished by way of Decree of 1 June 1931, ratified by Law of 30 December of the same year. In 1948, legal recognition of the usage of noble titles was provided for by Law of 4 May 1948 restoring the rules as they were before 14 April 1931.

At present, titles of nobility find their legal basis in article 62, section f, of the 1978 constitution, which grants the prerogative of the king to grant honors and distinctions in accordance with the laws.

Spanish legislation recognizes titles of nobility and protects their legal owners against third parties. The Spanish nobility titles are in no case susceptible of purchase or sale, since their succession is strictly reserved for blood relatives of better right of the first holder of the title. The successions are processed by the Ministry of Justice and their use is subject to their respective tax.

The legal status of individual titles can be checked at La Diputación de la Grandeza de España y Títulos del Reino (DGET) and using Guía de Títulos in the Navigation bar.

Classification of Spanish nobles

Spanish nobles are classified as either grandees, as titled nobles, or as untitled nobles.

In the past, grandees were divided into first, second, and third classes, but this division has ceased to be relevant in practice while remaining a titular distinction; legally all grandees enjoy the same privileges in modern times. At one time however, each class held special privileges such as:
 those who spoke to the king and received his reply with their heads covered.
 those who addressed the king uncovered, but put on their hats to hear his answer.
 those who awaited the permission of the king before covering themselves.

Additionally, all grandees were addressed by the king as mi Primo (my Cousin), whereas ordinary nobles were only qualified as mi Pariente (my Kinsman).

An individual may hold a grandeeship, whether in possession of a title of nobility or not. Normally, however, each grandeeship is attached to a title. A grandeeship is always attached to the grant of a ducal title. The grant of a grandeeship with any other rank of nobility has always been at the will of the sovereign. Excepting dukes and some very ancient titles of marquesses and counts, most Spanish titles of nobility are not attached to grandeeships.

A grandee of any rank outranks a non-grandee, even if that non-grandee's title is of a higher degree, with the exception of official members of the Spanish Royal Family who may in fact hold no title at all. Thus, a baron-grandee enjoys higher precedence than a marquess who is not a grandee.

Since 1987, the children of Spanish infantes, traditionally considered part of the royal family, have been entitled to the rank and style of a grandee but do not hold the legal dignity of grandee unless a grandeza is officially conferred by the sovereign; once the dignity has been officially bestowed, it becomes hereditary.

Some notable titles, which are attached to grandeeships, are: Duke of Alba, Duke of Medinaceli, Duke of Osuna, Duke of Infantado, Duke of Albuquerque, Duke of Nájera, Duke of Frías and Duke of Medina Sidonia, Marquess of Aguilar de Campoo, Marquess of Astorga, Marquess of Santillana, Marquess of Los Vélez, Count of Benavente, Count of Lerín, Count of Olivares, Count of Oñate, and Count of Lemos.

Form of address
Dukes, Grandees, their spouses and heirs are entitled to the honorific style of The Most Excellent Lord/Lady.

Non-Grandee titled nobles, their spouses and offspring use the style of The Most Illustrious Lord/Lady.

Ranks
The ordinary Spanish nobility is divided into six ranks. From highest to lowest, these are: Duque (Duke), Marqués (Marquess), Conde (Count), Vizconde (Viscount), Barón (Baron), and Señor (Lord) (as well as the feminine forms of these titles).

Nobility descends from the first man of a family who was raised to the nobility (or recognized as belonging to the hereditary nobility) to all his legitimate descendants, male and female, in the male line. Thus, most persons who are legally noble hold no noble title. Hereditary titles formerly descended by male-preference primogeniture, a woman being eligible to inherit only if she had no brother or if her brothers also inherited titles. However, by Spanish law, all hereditary titles descend by absolute primogeniture, gender no longer being a criterion for preference in inheritance, since 2005.

On October 21, 2022, the Spanish authorities abolished 33 aristocratic titles:
In early October, the Senate (upper house of parliament) of Spain approved a bill on historical memory, declaring the dictatorship of Francisco Franco and the judicial decisions made under his regime illegal.

Princes

The often overlooked title of 'prince' (príncipe/princesa) has historically been borne by those who have been granted or have inherited that title. It is often not included in lists of the Spanish nobility because it is rare.  Prince/Princess are English translations of Infante/Infanta, referring to the son or daughter of a king; such titles are reserved for members of the royal family (the heir to the throne or the consort of the Queen regnant). Historically, infante or infanta could refer to offspring, siblings, uncles and aunts of a king. The heir's princely titles derive from the ancient kingdoms which united to form Spain.

Three titles of prince are held by the heir to the Spanish throne.
 Prince of Asturias as heir apparent to the throne of the Kingdom of Castile and León.
 Prince of Girona as heir apparent to the throne of the Kingdom of Aragon.
 Prince of Viana as heir apparent to the throne of the Kingdom of Navarre.

Other titles of 'prince' were frequently granted by the kings of Spain, but usually in their capacity as kings of Naples or of Sicily. Such nobles often sojourned at the Spanish court where their titles were acknowledged, but rarely were Spanish nobles the recipients of a title of prince in Spain. The most notable exceptions were the title Prince of the Peace conferred in 1795 on Manuel Godoy, a favourite of the Spanish king and the title Prince of Vergara conferred to Baldomero Espartero. And Joseph Bonaparte conferred the title to be hereditary on his grandchildren in both the male and female line, Although legislation of the twentieth century ended official recognition of the title of prince outside the royal bloodline family, it did allow the holder of a princedom to have the dignity converted to a ducal title of the same name.
When military dictator Francisco Franco appointed Juan Carlos de Borbón as his heir apparent with the future title of king, he created the new titles of prince of Spain for him.

Duke/Duchess (Duque/Duquesa)

All dukedoms (except Fernandina) are attached to a grandeeship. A partial list includes:

 Duke of Abrantes
 Duke of Acerenza
 Duke of Ahumada
 Duke of Alba
 Duke of Alburquerque
 Duke of Alcalá de los Gazules
 Duke of Alcudia
 Duke of Algeciras
 Duke of Algete
 Duke of Aliaga
 Duke of Almazán
 Duke of Almazán de Saint Priest 
 Duke of Almodóvar del Río 
 Duke of Amalfi
 Duke of Andría
 Duke of Arco
 Duke of Arcos
 Duke of Arión
 Duke of Arjona
 Duke of Aveiro
 Duke of Bailén
 Duke of Béjar
 Duke of Benavente
 Duke of Bivona
 Duke of Cádiz
 Duke of Camiña
 Duke of Cardona
 Duke of Ciudad Real
 Duke of Ciudad Rodrigo, bestowed on the 1st Duke of Wellington for his services to the Spanish King
 Duke of Feria
 Duke of Franco, bestowed upon the descendants of General Francisco Franco (Defunct as of October 2022)
 Duke of Gandia
 Duke of Granada de Ega
 Duke of Infantado
 Duke of Lugo
 Duke of Mandas
 Duke of Medina Sidonia
 Duke of Medinaceli
 Duke of Moctezuma de Tultengo, held by the descendants of the Aztec Emperor Moctezuma II
 Duke of Mola, held by the descendants of Emilio Mola, a leader of the 1936 military putsch (Defunct as of October 2022)
 Duke of Osuna
 Duke of Palma de Mallorca
 Duke of Primo de Rivera
 Duke of Seville
 Duke of Suárez
 Duke of Sueca
 Duke of Tamames
 Duke of Tetuán
 Duke of Veragua, held by the descendants of Christopher Columbus
 Duke of la Victoria

Marquess/Marchioness (Marqués/Marquesa)

 Marquess of Almenara
 Marquess of Altamira
 Marquess of Alventos
 Marquess of Ardales
 Marquess of Astorga
 Marquess of Bolarque
 Marquess of Borghetto
 Marquess of Camarasa
 Marquess of Campotéjar
 Marquess of Castel-Moncayo
 Marquess of Cañada Honda
 Marquess of Cañete
 Marquess of Casa Fuerte
 Marquess of Del Bosque
 Marquess of Fuster
 Marquess of Griñón
 Marquess of Iria Flavia
 Marquess de los Jardines de Aranjuez
 Marquess of Leganés
 Marquess of Maratea
 Marquess of Moratalla
 Marquess of Navamorcuende
 Marquess of Novaliches
 Marquess of Larios
 Marquess of Laserna
 Marquess of Laula
 Marquess of Mohernando
 Marquess of O'Shea
 Marquess of Oquendo
 Marquess of Portago
 Marquess of Samaranch
 Marquess of San Damián
 Marquess of San Felices de Aragón
 Marquess of Santa Cruz
 Marquess of San Saturnino
 Marquess of Silvela
 Marquess of Terranova
 Marquess of Torre Soto de Briviesca
 Marquess of Urquijo
 Marquess of Valdecarzana
 Marquess of Valdueza
 Marquess of Vallado
 Marquess of Vargas Llosa
 Marquess of Villabrágima
 Marquess of Villaviciosa de Asturias
 Marquess of Villena

Count/Countess (Conde/Condesa)

 Count of Altamira
 Count of Barcelona held by Don Juan, heir of Alfonso XIII, father of Juan Carlos I
 Count of Baños
 Count of Batanes
 Count of Bornos
 Count of Cervera
 Count of Covadonga
 Count of Elda: belonged to the House of Coloma.
 Count of Empúries
 Count of Fontanar
 Count of Fontao
 Count of Lemos
 Count of Lerín
 Count of Lucena 
 Count of Maceda
 Count of Manila
 Count of Mansilla
 Count of la Maza
 Count of la Mejorada
 Count of Montijo
 Count of Olocau
 Count of Roussillon
 Count of Salvatierra
 Count of San Esteban de Cañongo
 Count of Teba
 Count of Toreno
 Count of Torre Arias
 Count of Urgell
 Count of Velayos
 Count of Villacieros
 Count of Villada
 Count of Yebes
 Count of Osorno

Viscount/Viscountess (Vizconde/Vizcondesa)

 Viscount of la Alborada
 Viscount of Altamira
 Viscount of Banderas
 Viscount of Cabrera
 Viscount of la Calzada
 Viscount of Castillo de Almansa
 Viscount of Jala-Jala
 Viscount of Mindanao
 Viscount of Quintanilla de Florez
 Viscount of Rocabertí

Baron/Baroness (Barón/Baronesa)

Baronies did not exist in the Kingdom of Castile nor the Kingdom of Navarre, and the subsequent kings of Spain did not confer any baronies attached to Castilian or Navarrese estates. However, they did exist in the Kingdom of Aragon, such as:
Baron of Polop

Lord/Lady (Señor/Señora) (Don/Doña)

The title of Señor is, together with that of Conde, the oldest in seniority of the Spanish realms. Many of these lordships are among the oldest titles of nobility in Spain, and the señor usually exercised military and administrative powers over the lordship. Although some lordships were created by the kings of Spain, others existed before them and have not been created by any known king. For example, the lord of Biscay held a great degree of independence from the king of Castile, to whom he could pledge or not pledge feudal allegiance, but of whom he was not automatically a vassal: each new lord of Biscay had to renew his oath to the king. Ultimately, however, the kings of Castile inherited the lordship.

Besides those held by the King, in Spain remain seven lordships that maintain the official consideration of Titles of the Kingdom according to the Official Guide of the Titles and Grandees of the Kingdom published by the Ministry of Justice: the Lordship of Solar de Tejada, the Lordship of Solar de Mandayona y Villaseca,  the Lordship of Alconchel, the Lordship of Lazcano (with Grandee of Spain), the Lordship of Rubianes (with Grandee of Spain), the Lordship of Higuera de Vargas (with Grandee of Spain), the Lordship of Meirás (with Grandee of Spain) and the Lordship of Sonseca. Other lordships that were considered as Titles of the Kingdom in the past, have not been rehabilitated.

Lord of Alconchel
Lord of Balaguer, held by the King of Spain
Lord of Biscay, held by the Spanish monarchy since 1378, when merged with the previously semi-independent lordship of Biscay
Lord of Higuera de Vargas
Lord of Casa Lazcano
Lord of Meirás, señora de Meiras, Carmen Polo wife of Francisco Franco
Lord of Casa Rubianes
Lord of Solar de Tejada
Lord of Sonseca

Other titles

Infante: currently borne by royal princes, other than the heir apparent to the throne, who are sons of a Spanish king.
Knight of the Order of Charles III caballero de la Orden de Carlos III: the bestowal of the highest order of knighthood on an individual grants personal nobility and certain heraldic privileges such as a heraldic mantle. The King of Spain continues to bestow this honor. 
Knight of the Royal Order of Isabella the Catholic caballero de la Orden de Isabel la Catolica: the bestowal of the second highest order of knighthood on an individual grants personal nobility and certain heraldic privileges such as a golden heraldic mantle. The King of Spain continues to bestow this honor. 
Ricohombre (fem. Ricahembra): used during the Reconquista. By the 17th century, it was a synonym of nobleman.
Condestable:  cognate with "constable", it was a hereditary title used in the kingdoms of Castile and León for the official second in authority to the king. It became hereditary in the Velasco family which, however, gradually lost the powers once attributed to the Condestable of Castile.
Caballero: equivalent to knight, it was very rare in the kingdom of Castile, but common in the kingdom of Aragon, where there were four types of caballeros:
Golden-spur caballero: borne by those infanzones (descendants of one of the cadet branches of the kings of Aragon which did not inherit the throne) who had been knighted. They were the highest ranking knights.
Royal-privilege caballero: a personal, non-hereditary title granted by the king to doctors of the law. It was rarely used by its holders, since the doctoral status enjoyed more privileges.
Caballero Mesnadero: borne by the cadet sons of a Ricohombre. It fell into desuetude during the 18th century, when the Bourbon kings purged the ranks of the nobility.
Caballero franco: borne by those of hijosdalgo or infanzone status, but who were commoner-born.
Potestad: borne only in the kingdom of Aragon, the equivalent of the Italian podestà, an administrative title. It disappeared with the Nueva Planta decrees in 1713.

Lower nobility

 was the most common of these:
The first of the kings of Pamplona and Asturias were originally elected and lifted up on a shield to assume  status, by these otherwise untitled nobles. Unlike Spain's later titled nobles, the early  did not necessarily possess or receive any fief or land grant. Many were as poor as commoners, although they were tax-exempt and could join the civil service or the army.

During the Middle Ages  became a title granted by the kings of Castile as a reward for service done to the crown (or, as in Biscay, as a way of recognizing prior rights). In the same way  was granted for military achievement when the  ended. Being the most obvious proof of noble descent,  came to be the only lesser title to remain among the modern ranks of Spanish nobility. From this ancient estate of the realm emerged Spain's nobility. All titled and untitled nobles are considered , but many of the modern titled nobility do not descend from the original .

The term  indicated membership in a family whose noble status was recognized in the earliest records of its existence; thus its immemorial nobility was acknowledged but not created by any monarch.

Succession

The evidence supporting one's claim to a title may be reviewed by the Council of Grandees and Titled Nobles of the Kingdom (Diputación de Grandes y Títulos del Reino). The body includes eight grandees, eight nobles who are not grandees, and a president who must hold both a grandeeship and a hereditary title unattached to a grandeeship.

Succession to Spanish noble titles is hereditary, but not automatic. The original letters patent which created the title determine the order of succession. Payment of substantial fees is required whenever a title is inherited.

While noble titles historically have followed the rule of male-preference primogeniture, a Spanish law came into effect on 30 October 2006, after approval by both houses of the Cortes, establishing the inheritance of hereditary noble titles by the firstborn regardless of gender. The law is retroactive to 27 July 2005.

Following the death of a noble, the senior heir may petition the sovereign through the Spanish Ministry of Justice for permission to use the title. If the senior heir does not make a petition within two years, then other potential heirs may do so on their own behalf. There is a limit of forty years from the vacancy by death or relinquishment of a title within which that title may be claimed and revived by an heir.

The petitioner must demonstrate that he or she is a child, grandchild or direct male line descendant of a noble (whether a grandee or not), or that he or she belongs to certain bodies or orders of chivalry deemed noble, or that the father's family is recognized as noble. The amount of fees due depend on whether the title is attached to a grandeeship or not, and on whether the heir is a direct descendant or a collateral kinsman of the previous holder. The petition is normally granted, except if the petitioner is a criminal.

Titles may also be ceded to heirs other than the senior heir, during the lifetime of the main titleholder. Normally, this process is used to allow younger children to succeed to lesser titles, while the highest or principal title goes to the senior heir. Only subsidiary titles may be ceded; the principal title must be reserved for the senior heir. The cession of titles may only be done with the approval of the monarch.

The late Cayetana Fitz-James Stuart, 18th Duchess of Alba (1926–2014) holds the Guinness World Record for number of titles with over 50 titles. Before her death, she ceded some of her titles to each of her six children; otherwise, all but the eldest would have been excluded from succession.

Alternative nobility
The pretender Carlist branch of the Bourbons created its own titles for its supporters, unrecognized by the ruling Christinos branch.
When General Francisco Franco became head of state with the support of, among others, Carlist troops, Carlist titles became officially recognized.

Titles created during the reign of King Juan Carlos 

From the beginning of his reign in November 1975, King Juan Carlos created new titles for about 51 people (as of April 2011), among others recognizing the merits of politicians and artists. Some of these dignities have been hereditary. Examples include:
 Carmen Franco y Polo, daughter of dictator Francisco Franco, created 1st Duchess of Franco and Grandee of Spain in 1975
 Carlos Arias Navarro, Prime Minister, created 1st Marquess of Arias Navarro and Grandee of Spain in 1976
 Torcuato Fernández-Miranda, Prime Minister, created 1st Duke of Fernandez-Miranda and Grandee of Spain in 1977
 Adolfo Suárez, Prime Minister, created 1st Duke of Suárez and Grandee of Spain in 1981
 Andrés Segovia, classical guitarist, created 1st Marquess of Salobreña in 1981
 Salvador Dalí, surrealist painter, created 1st Marquess of Dalí de Púbol in 1982
 Joaquín Rodrigo, composer and pianist, created 1st Marquess of los Jardines de Aranjuez in 1991
 Juan Antonio Samaranch, President of the International Olympic Committee, created 1st Marquess of Samaranch and Grandee of Spain in 1991
 Manuel Gutiérrez Mellado, officer and politician, created 1st Marquess of Gutiérrez-Mellado in 1994
 Camilo José Cela, author and Nobel laureate, created 1st Marquess of Iria Flavia in 1996
 Leopoldo Calvo-Sotelo, Prime Minister, created 1st Marquess of the Ría of Ribadeo and Grandee of Spain in 2002
 Margarita Salas, scientist, created 1st Marchioness of Canero in 2008
 Paloma O'Shea Artiñano, pianist, created Marchioness of O'Shea in 2008
 José Ángel Sánchez Asiaín, an international banker, created 1st Marquess of Asiaín in 2010
 Antoni Tàpies, painter, created 1st Marquess of Tàpies in 2010
 Vicente del Bosque, football manager, created 1st Marquess of Del Bosque in 2011
 Mario Vargas Llosa, author and Nobel laureate, created 1st Marquess of Vargas Llosa in 2011.

King Juan Carlos also exceptionally confirmed the title of Count of Barcelona, a title historically attached to the Crown, but used as a title of pretence by his father, Infante Juan, during the dynasty's 20th century exile and the subsequent reign of his son.

Titles created during the reign of King Felipe VI 
King Felipe VI has not yet created any new titles of nobility. He has, however, revived the dukedom of Fernandina, the marquisate of Murillo, and the county of Torre Alegre; and has reverted to the crown the dukedom of Palma Mallorca, formerly belonging to his elder sister, Infanta Cristina of Spain, over a corruption enquiry.

Gallery

See also 
 Immemorial nobility

Notes

References
Atienza, Julio de. Nobiliario Español: Diccionario Heráldico de Apellidos Españoles y de Títulos Nobiliarios. Madrid: Aguilar, 1948.
Figueroa y Melgar, Alfonso de. Estudio Histórico Sobre Algunas Familias Españolas. 6v. in 12 parts. Madrid: Editions Dawson & Fry, 1965.
Noble Titles in Spain and Spanish Grandees
Nobility & Grandee Titles in Spain (Ministry of Justice)